The 2017 ARCA Racing Series presented by Menards was the 65th season of the ARCA Racing Series. The season began on February 18 with the Lucas Oil 200 Driven by General Tire and ended on October 20 with the Kansas 150. Austin Theriault, driving for the Ken Schrader Racing team, won the drivers' championship on the strength of seven wins. Dalton Sargeant, winner of three races, was runner-up to Theriault.

Teams and drivers

Complete schedule

Limited schedule

Notes

Changes

Teams
 Joe Gibbs Racing returned in the ARCA series with Riley Herbst in the No. 18 Toyota Camry full-time. Herbst was ineligible to race at Daytona, which was raced instead by Matt Tifft

Drivers
 Zane Smith drove in 11 races for Venturini Motorsports in the No. 55 Toyota Camry. Smith was ineligible to race at Daytona and Talladega, which were raced instead by Noah Gragson.
 Gus Dean drove for Win-Tron Racing full-time in the No. 32 Toyota Camry. Dean drove for Mason Mitchell Motorsports in 5 races in and won at Talladega in his second start.
 Dalton Sargeant drove for Cunningham Motorsports full-time in the No. 77 Ford Fusion, replacing champion Chase Briscoe, who moved to Brad Keselowski Racing in the NASCAR Camping World Truck Series. Sargeant drove 15 races for Venturini Motorsports in the No. 55 and won the Berlin race in 2016.
 Quin Houff drove the No. 98 at Daytona for Mason Mitchell Motorsports in his ARCA debut.
 Shane Lee drove full-time for Cunningham Motorsports in 2017.

Schedule

Results and standings

Races

Drivers' championship 

(key) Bold – Pole position awarded by time. Italics – Pole position set by final practice results or rainout. * – Most laps led.

See also
 2017 Monster Energy NASCAR Cup Series
 2017 NASCAR Xfinity Series
 2017 NASCAR Camping World Truck Series
 2017 NASCAR K&N Pro Series East
 2017 NASCAR K&N Pro Series West
 2017 NASCAR Whelen Modified Tour
 2017 NASCAR Pinty's Series
 2017 NASCAR PEAK Mexico Series
 2017 NASCAR Whelen Euro Series

References

External links 

 

ARCA Menards Series seasons
ARCA Racing Series